Bernard de Nogaret de La Valette (1592, in Angoulême – 25 July 1661), duke of Épernon and a French general, was the son of Jean Louis de Nogaret de La Valette and Marguerite de Foix-Candale, granddaughter of the constable of Montmorency.  Through his mother's line, Bernard could also claim the English title of Earl of Kendal, originally granted to his ancestor John de Foix in 1446.

Life
In 1622, Bernard married Gabrielle-Angélique de Verneuil, legitimised daughter of Henri IV and the Marquise de Verneuil, with whom he had a son, Louis-Charles-Gaston de Candale, and a daughter, Anne-Louise-Christine de Foix de La Valette d'Épernon.  Gabrielle-Angélique died in 1627 (some say Bernard poisoned her) and in 1634 he married Marie Ducambaut, a niece of Cardinal Richelieu.  It was not a happy marriage, as Bernard later conceived a lifelong passion for a middle-class woman named Ninon de Lartigue, who exerted absolute power over him and to whom he gave enormous sums of money.

Like his father, Bernard made a career of the military.  He was named Colonel-General of infantry and fought at the sieges of Saint-Jean-d'Angély and of Royan (1621) and at the attack of the pas de Suse (1629).  On 15 May 1633, Bernard became a Chevalier du Saint-Esprit and in 1635 he was charged by Louis XIII with restoring the order which had been disturbed by lifting of taxes and religious passions. He fought in Picardy (1636), in Guyenne, and finally against the Spaniards, and repressed the peasants' revolt (Révolte des Croquants) in 1637.

Charged by the Prince de Condé in 1638 with leading the assault at the Siege of Fuenterrabía (Hondarribia), he refused, believing that the breach was not broad enough. He yielded his post to Vice-Admiral de Sourdis who launched an ill-fated attack which resulted in heavy losses.  This disaster was attributed to the duke of Valette, who had nothing to do with it and who in fact deserved praise for rejoining the remains of the army and leading it to Bayonne. Richelieu, who hated de La Valette, had him tried in front of an extraordinary court chaired by the king himself (1639). The court returned a sentence of death but de La Valette, who knew Richelieu well, had prudently departed for England where he received the Order of the Garter.  The penalty was carried out in effigy.

In 1642 Bernard's father died, raising him to the title of duke of Épernon.  After the death of Louis XIII, Bernard returned to France where the Parliament of Paris cancelled the judgement against him (1643).  In 1648 he became governor of Guyenne.  That same year, he was responsible for transporting artillery of the Château du Hâ to arm the Château-Trompette to put down unrest resulting from the Parliament of Bordeaux's refusal to allow the departure of a shipment of corn, for fear of famine.  Bernard also served as governor of Burgundy (1654–1660) and was a guard of the theatre company of Charles Dufresne (whose most famous member was Molière).

He died in Paris in 1661.

Family
Children included:
 Louis-Charles-Gaston de Candale
 Anne-Louise-Christine de Foix de La Valette d’Épernon

See also
Guillaume de Nogaret
Jean Parisot de la Valette
Jean Louis de Nogaret de La Valette

References
Bernard de Nogaret de La Valette d'Épernon (French Wikipedia)

External links

Arms of Epernon
 Valette family tree

1592 births
1661 deaths
People from Angoulême
Dukes of Épernon
Counts of Candale
French generals
Knights of the Garter
Peers created by Louis XIII
Military personnel of the Franco-Spanish War (1635–1659)